Corack East is a locality in the Mount Jeffcott ward of the local government area of the Shire of Buloke, Victoria, Australia. A rural CFA station is located in the town. Corack East post office opened on 1 August 1891 and was closed on 24 May 1976.

References